Tunhovdfjorden is a lake in the Nore og Uvdal municipality in Viken county, Norway.  It has an area of 25.30 km² and a circumference of 62.79 km. It is part of the  Numedalslågen watershed. Tunhovdfjorden is known for its trout and is popular for ice fishing.

References

Lakes of Viken (county)